Marie Niedermann (27 September 1880 – 23 May 1967) was a Danish film actress. She appeared in 23 films between 1910 and 1954. She was born and died in Denmark.

Filmography

 Karen, Maren og Mette (1954)
 Vesterhavsdrenge (1950)
 Når katten er ude (1947)
 Elly Petersen (1944)
 Drama på slottet (1943)
 Moster fra Mols (1943)
 Alt for karrieren (1943)
 Forellen (1942)
 Søren Søndervold (1942)
 Tordenskjold går i land (1942)
 Thummelumsen (1941)
 Peter Andersen (1941)
 Alle går rundt og forelsker sig (1941)
 Niels Pind og hans dreng (1941)
 Sommerglæder (1940)
 En lille tilfældighed (1939)
 Den gamle præst (1939)
 Giftes - nej tak! (1936)
 Fra fyrste til knejpevært (1913)
 Ansigttyven II (1910)
 Ansigttyven I (1910)
 Valdemar Sejr (1910)
 Elverhøj (1910)

External links

1880 births
1967 deaths
Danish film actresses
Danish silent film actresses
20th-century Danish actresses